No Absolutes in Human Suffering is the third and final studio album by American hardcore band Gaza. The album's name is inspired by novelist Cormac McCarthy.

Track listing

Personnel
 Jon Parkin – vocals
 Michael Mason – guitar
 Anthony Lucero – bass
 Casey Hansen – drums

References

Black Market Activities albums
Albums produced by Kurt Ballou
2012 albums
Gaza (band) albums